The 1937 Rutgers Queensmen football team represented Rutgers University in the 1937 college football season. In their seventh season under head coach J. Wilder Tasker, the Queensmen compiled a 5–6 record and outscored their opponents 128 to 39. In February 1938, Rutgers announced Tasker's resignation as Rutgers' football coach and his replacement by Harvey Harman.

Schedule

References

Rutgers
Rutgers Scarlet Knights football seasons
Rutgers Queensmen football